Solarroller is a BEAM dragster photovore robot run by solar panel that utilizes sunlight. In competitions between solarrollers, each one must run one meter in the shortest time possible. Components include pager motors,
capacitors, resistors, transistors, and solar panels.

There are several different kinds of configurations of solarrollers, with bigger or smaller wheels, one or two motors. Configurations differences include: 
 motor (number and output),
 wheels (number and size), and 
 frame designs

This robot type always moves forwards. The motor drives one or more wheels. A "Solar Engine" circuit is used to feed the robot.
Solarroller's speed is directly related to the amount of light robot registers on its optical sensor. Most are driven by an electronic "relaxation oscillator", in which a charge is accumulated in a capacitor while at rest and then suddenly released in the drive mechanism.

See also
Mark Tilden

Further reading
 "Simple Solaroller". Electronics Now, June, 1997.
 Solarroller circuits. Mark Tilden's hand-written notes (c. 1990), solarbotics.net.
 Solarroller mechanics. Mark Tilden's hand-written notes (c. 1990), solarbotics.net.

External articles
 Solarbotics.net gallery of Solarrollers
 BEAM robotics Yahoo! group
 Beam-Online sollarrolers gallery with several different configurations
 2003 BEAM SolarRoller Race, robotgames.net
 Solarrollers on the BEAM Wiki

Solar car racing
Solar energy
BEAM robotics